1983 ACC tournament may refer to:

 1983 ACC men's basketball tournament
 1983 ACC women's basketball tournament
 1983 Atlantic Coast Conference baseball tournament